is a Japanese composer and arranger from Hokkaido. He is best known for composing music for the Death Note, Real Drive, Akagi and Kaiji anime TV series. He also composed music used in the anime Aoi Bungaku and the "Heian Arc" of the anime Otogi Zoshi. In addition, he performed opening theme songs for Hajime no Ippo as a guitarist in the rock band Shocking Lemon.

In May 2012, Taniuchi was arrested in Kanagawa Prefecture on marijuana charges.

Works
Otogi Zoshi Heian Arc (2004–2005)
Tōhai Densetsu Akagi: Yami ni Maiorita Tensai (2005–2006)
Death Note (with Yoshihisa Hirano) (2006–2007)
Kaiji: Ultimate Survivor (2007–2008)
Real Drive (with Yoshihisa Hirano) (2008)
Aoi Bungaku (episodes 1–8, 11–12) (2009)
Kaiji: Against All Rules (2011)

References

External links
 

Year of birth missing (living people)
Anime composers
Japanese composers
Japanese film score composers
Japanese male composers
Japanese male film score composers
Living people